William Reed Huntington (September 20, 1838 – July 26, 1909) was an American Episcopal priest and author.

Life
Huntington was born in Lowell, Massachusetts. He began his education at Norwich University at Alden Partridge's military college in Norwich, Vermont and eventually transferred and graduated from Harvard in 1859 and in 1859–1860 was an instructor in chemistry there. Entering the Episcopal ministry, he was rector of All Saints Church, Worcester, Massachusetts, in 1862–1883 and of Grace Church, New York from 1883 until his death. Huntington always took a prominent part in public affairs. He was active in the movement for liturgical revisions and was secretary of the Prayer-Book Revisions Committee, and editor with Samuel Hart of the Standard Prayer-Book of 1892.  Huntington died in Nahant, Massachusetts, in 1909. Huntington was elected a member of the American Antiquarian Society in 1875.

Works
The Chicago-Lambeth Quadrilateral had its genesis in an 1870 essay by Huntington. In The Church Idea, an Essay toward Unity Huntington's goal was to establish "a basis on which approach may be by God's blessing, made toward Home Reunion," i.e., with the Roman Catholic and Eastern Orthodox Churches. The Quadrilateral is a four-point articulation of Anglican identity, often cited as encapsulating the fundamentals of the Communion's doctrine and as a reference-point for ecumenical discussion with other Christian denominations. The four points are:
The Holy Scriptures, as containing all things necessary to salvation;
The Creeds (specifically, the Apostles' and Nicene Creeds), as the sufficient statement of Christian faith;
The dominical sacraments of Baptism and Holy Communion;
The historic episcopate, locally adapted.

The Quadrilateral has had a significant impact on Anglican identity since its passage by the Lambeth Conference. The Resolution came at a time of rapid expansion of the Anglican Communion, primarily in the territories of the British Empire. As such, it provided a basis for a shared ethos, one that became increasingly important as colonial churches influenced by British culture and values, evolved into national ones influenced by local norms.

Huntington also wrote:
Conditional Immortality (1878)
The Book Annexed: Its Critics and its Prospects (1886)
Short History of the Book of Common Prayer (1893)
A National Church (1898)
Sonnets and a Dream. Jamaica, Queensborough, New York: The Marion Press, 1899.
A Good Shepherd and Other Sermons (1906)

Veneration
Huntington is honored with a feast day on the liturgical calendar of the Episcopal Church (USA) on July 27.

References

External links
 Documents by William Reed Huntington from Project Canterbury
 
 
 

American religious writers
Anglican saints
Writers from Worcester, Massachusetts
Writers from New York City
Harvard University alumni
Harvard University staff
1838 births
1909 deaths
19th-century American Episcopal priests
American Episcopal theologians
20th-century Christian saints
Members of the American Antiquarian Society